Wild Things! is a 1966 studio album by the Ventures, released on Dolton Records BLP-2047 (mono) and BST-8047.  A 4-track reel-to-reel release was subsequently issued by Music Tapes, Inc.  The album is noted for its marked turn towards a heavier sound in comparison to earlier Ventures releases, and the standout  track Wild Child which was prominently featured as a sample in "Start the Commotion" by The Wiseguys.

Background
Recorded directly after completing a tour of the central United States in the summer of 1966, the album presents The Ventures updating their sound to a "mod, go-go" style.  Allmusic notes that the album is consistently "hard-edged" thanks to fuzztone Mosrites, and that the original instrumentals are better than throw-a ways.  Leading off the album is a cover of The Troggs' "Wild Thing".  The track features a "vocal" by Don Wilson, doing an impersonation of Peter Lorre reciting parts of the original lyrics, to humorous effect.  The next track, "Fuzzy and Wild", is the first of the original instrumentals, each of which included the word "wild" in the title.  "Wild and Wooly" was not a Ventures original, but was originally called "Murfreesboro" by its composer, Danny Hamilton.  Perhaps the oddest title belongs to "How Now Wild Cow", a play on the phrase of elocution suggested by one of Mel Taylor's sons.

"Wild Child"
The track "Wild Child", featuring a "catchy guitar loop", was prominently featured in The Wiseguys' 1999 song "Start the Commotion".  The Wiseguys' recording was subsequently used in a television commercial for Mitsubishi automobiles, and in a promo for Ally McBeal; this exposure ushered in a new chapter into the Ventures' career. Having been alerted to the use of their recording, The Ventures confirmed with EMI that they owned rights to their composition, and subsequently received two-thirds of the writing royalties for "Start the Commotion".  Additional income for The Ventures came in the form of synchronization rights from the song. The Ventures at this point realized that royalties from their back catalog, as well as performing new music specifically designed for use in multimedia productions, could produce a significant source of additional income.

Reception
Wild Things! first appeared on the Billboard Top Albums chart on September 17, 1966. It maintained a position on this chart for a sum of 26 weeks, achieving a top position of #33.  Allmusic gives a mildly favorable rating to the album, but compares it unfavorably to some earlier Ventures records.

Track listing

Personnel

Ventures
Don Wilson – rhythm and lead guitar
Nokie Edwards – lead guitar 
Bob Bogle – bass , lead guitar
Mel Taylor – drums

Technical
 Joe Saraceno – producer
 Ami Hadani – engineer
 Woody Woodward – art director
 Peter Whorf – cover photography

References

1966 albums
The Ventures albums
Dolton Records albums